Highland Lake is a town in Blount County, Alabama, United States. At the 2020 census, the population was 412.

Geography
Highland Lake is located in eastern Blount County at 33°53'3.376" North, 86°25'19.744" West (33.884271, -86.422151). The town consists of homes built around Highland Lake, a reservoir on the Blackburn Fork of the Little Warrior River.

Demographics

As of the census of 2000, there were 408 people, 164 households, and 129 families residing in the town. The racial makeup of the town was 97.30% White, 0.25% Black or African American, 1.23% Native American, 0.74% Asian, and 0.49% from two or more races. 0.74% of the population were Hispanic or Latino of any race.

There were 164 households, out of which 29.3% had children under the age of 18 living with them, 72.0% were married couples living together, 4.3% had a female householder with no husband present, and 21.3% were non-families. 18.9% of all households were made up of individuals, and 6.7% had someone living alone who was 65 years of age or older. The average household size was 2.49 and the average family size was 2.84.

In the town, the population was spread out, with 23.3% under the age of 18, 5.4% from 18 to 24, 27.2% from 25 to 44, 29.2% from 45 to 64, and 15.0% who were 65 years of age or older. The median age was 40 years. For every 100 females, there were 96.2 males. For every 100 females age 18 and over, there were 98.1 males.

The median income for a household in the town was $43,229, and the median income for a family was $48,750. Males had a median income of $34,750 versus $28,333 for females. The per capita income for the town was $25,829. None of the families and 3.5% of the population were living below the poverty line, including no under eighteens and 5.4% of those over 64.

References

External links
Town of Highland Lake official website

Towns in Blount County, Alabama
Towns in Alabama
Birmingham metropolitan area, Alabama